Iie Sumirat (born 15 November 1950 in Bandung, West Java) is a former badminton player from Indonesia.

Career
Sumirat was one of Indonesia's leading singles players during the 1970s, when it dominated men's international competition while China was still absent from IBF sanctioned play. As fellow countryman Rudy Hartono was winning his eighth All-England Championship in March 1976, the hard smashing Sumirat was winning the Asian Invitation Tournament in Bangkok, Thailand, edging aging Chinese badminton legend Hou Jiachang in the final. In the first IBF World Championships in 1977 Sumirat reached the semifinal round but was defeated by the eventual winner Flemming Delfs. Sumirat played on the world champion Indonesian Thomas Cup (men's international) teams of 1976 and 1979, splitting duty at second singles behind Hartono in '76, and playing second singles behind Liem Swie King on a '79 team which shut out its semifinal and final round opponents.

Sumirat coached after his high level playing career ended. He helped Taufik Hidayat, in particular, learn his deceptive net play.

Achievements

IBF World Championships 
Men's Singles

World Cup 
Men's singles

Asian Games 
Men's singles

International Tournaments 
Men's singles

Men's doubles

Invitational Tournament 

Men's singles

References

1950 births
Living people
Indonesian male badminton players
Sundanese people
Sportspeople from Bandung
Asian Games medalists in badminton
Asian Games gold medalists for Indonesia
Asian Games bronze medalists for Indonesia
Badminton players at the 1978 Asian Games
Medalists at the 1978 Asian Games
21st-century Indonesian people
20th-century Indonesian people